Eric Julian Steig is a Canadian-American glaciologist and geochemist who serves as professor of Earth and Space sciences at the University of Washington. He is also the founding co-director of ISOLAB and a founding member of RealClimate. In 2019, he was named a fellow of the American Association for the Advancement of Science.

References

External links
Faculty page

American glaciologists
Living people
Fellows of the American Association for the Advancement of Science
University of Washington faculty
University of Washington alumni
American geochemists
Canadian geochemists
Canadian glaciologists
University of Colorado faculty
Academics of the University of Edinburgh
Hampshire College alumni
University of Pennsylvania faculty
Canadian expatriates in Scotland
American expatriate academics
Canadian expatriate academics in the United Kingdom
American expatriates in Scotland
Year of birth missing (living people)